Ommatospila narcaeusalis, the ommatospila moth, is a moth of the family Crambidae described by Francis Walker in 1859. It can be found in the southern parts of the United States, South America and several Caribbean islands, such as the Antilles and Jamaica.

References

"Ommatospila narcaeusalis". Moths of the Grenadines. Retrieved June 2, 2018.

Moths described in 1859
Spilomelinae